Mohan is a Mohyal Brahmin clan found primarily in the Punjab region of India.

References

Mohyal clans
Indian surnames
Hindu surnames
Punjabi-language surnames
Punjabi tribes
Social groups of Punjab, India
Social groups of Jammu and Kashmir